Cavanal Hill (officially Cavanal Mountain), located near Poteau, Oklahoma, is described by a sign at its base as the "'World's Highest Hill' – Elevation: 1,999 feet".

Hill / mountain  
The billing is based on a delineation between a hill and a mountain, that being if the geographical feature were 2,000 feet or higher than its base, then it would be classified as a mountain instead of a hill. However, the United States Geographic Names Information System contains thousands of summits with "hill" in their names which are higher than 2,000 feet.

Etymology
One source claims that the name is derived from a French word meaning "cave": . Oklahoma historian Muriel H. Wright wrote that  cavanol is a corruption of the French word , meaning "cavernous."

History
Cavanal Hill was a notable landmark for French explorers who traveled this area in the 18th century and gave the landmark its name.  During the late 1700s, French fur trappers established a camp at the base of Cavanal and named it Poteau, for "Post". Thomas Nuttall studied plant life here in 1819, and learned about other natural wonders from local French trappers and Indians who were living here.

During territorial times Cavanal Hill was along the border of Skullyville County and Sugar Loaf County, two of the constituent counties making up the Moshulatubbee District of the Choctaw Nation.

In the late 1800s, Walter Beard established a health resort at the summit of Cavanal Hill. This was a modest wood-frame structure that catered to visitors in the area. Besides the view, the major draw was the natural springs that occur throughout the region.

Halfway up Cavanal Hill, George Witte established the town of Witteville. This was a coal mining company town. The mines were located three miles east of the town. Witteville is still marked on some maps, and can be found at the "Y" leading up to the top of Cavanal Hill. Much of the road leading up to the top of the hill was part of the original railroad that led to Witteville.

In the 1960s, Senator Robert S. Kerr established a summer residence at the summit of Cavanal Hill. This summer house was located on the same site where Walter Beard first established his health resort.

Recreation
Cavanal Hill is now the site of mountain bike races and the Cavanal Hill Killer 5-Mile Walk. A  blacktopped road leads to the summit where visitors can enjoy picturesque views of the Poteau River Valley. Reportedly, one can see Mount Magazine in Arkansas from here on a clear day.

References

External links
 Oklahoma on Geocities
 360-degree view of Cavanal Hill photographed by Theodore Hampton
 https://web.archive.org/web/20171222053100/http://poteauimprovementproject.org/

Landforms of Le Flore County, Oklahoma
Hills of Oklahoma